Rosemary Gladstar is an American herbalist.

Biography
She began her work in herbalism in California, and she founded the California School of Herbal Studies in Forestville, California, the first herbal school in California, in 1978. Gladstar taught at the school with the help of herbalists such as Christopher Hobbs.  She moved to Vermont in 1987 and co-founded Sage Mountain Herbs. Gladstar founded United Plant Savers out of concern over the ecological sustainability of the herb trade; she serves as president of the Board of Directors of United Plant Savers. Gladstar helped found the Northeast Herb Association in 1991. She is the co-founder of the International Herb Symposium and The New England Women's Herbal Conference. The New England Women's Herbal Conference is held yearly in August at Camp Wicosuta in Newfound Lake, New Hampshire. Gladstar announced her retirement from being the director of the conference during the 2018 event.

Gladstar is the author of several books, including  Herbal Healing for Women, Herbs for Natural Beauty, Herbs for the Home Medicine Chest, Herbal Recipes for Vibrant Health and Planting the Future: Saving Our Medicinal Herbs. She has taught herbs extensively throughout the U.S. She organizes the International Herb Symposium and the United Plant Savers conference, and speaks widely at other herbal conferences including the Southwest Conference, Medicines from the Earth, the Green Nations Gathering and Breitenbush. She also leads herbal travel adventures in various parts of the world.

Works
Gladstar, Rosemary. (2001) Rosemary Gladstar's family herbal a guide to living life with energy, health, and vitality. North Adams, Mass. : Storey Books, c2001.vii, 400 p. : ill. (some col.) ; 19 cm.
Gladstar, Rosemary. (2000) Planting the future : saving our medicinal herbs / edited by Rosemary Gladstar and Pamela Hirsch.Rochester, Vt. : Healing Arts Press, c2000.x, 310 p., [8] p. of plates : ill. (some col.) ; 26 cm.

References

External links
Sage Mountain 
United Plant Savers

Herbalists
American conservationists
Activists from the San Francisco Bay Area
People from Forestville, California
Year of birth missing (living people)
Living people
American women non-fiction writers
21st-century American women